"Das Bus" is the fourteenth episode of the ninth season of the American animated television series The Simpsons. It originally aired on  Fox in the United States on February 15, 1998. In an extended parody of Lord of the Flies, Bart, Lisa, and other students from Springfield Elementary School are stranded on an island and are forced to work together. Meanwhile, Homer founds his own Internet company. It was written by David X. Cohen and directed by Pete Michels. Guest star James Earl Jones narrates the final scene of the episode.

Plot

The Springfield Elementary School Model United Nations club is going on a field trip. On the bus, Bart, Nelson, Ralph, and Milhouse play a game by racing fruit down the aisle. Milhouse rolls a grapefruit that gets stuck under the brakes. When Otto tries to press down on the pedal, it squirts juice into his eyes, causing him to lose control and drive the bus off a bridge. While swimming for help, Otto gets swept away by the current and picked up by fishermen, who plan to use him for slave labor below deck of their ship.

The students swim to a nearby tropical island, where everyone falls to accusing each other. But then Nelson points out that they shouldn't blame each other because they all know it was all Milhouse's fault since, according to either Sherri or Terri that he "and his stupid grapefruit almost got them killed.". Bart tries to tell everyone that being stranded is fun and imagines a lavish lifestyle there. Reality sets in when the island is found to be largely barren and the kids lack survival skills. With no food or adult supervision, the kids rely on snack food retrieved from the sunken bus by Bart, while Lisa sets up a ration system. They awake the next morning to find the snacks all gone. Suspecting Milhouse, he blames the loss on a mysterious island "monster", which does not hold water with most of the kids. As they prepare to lynch him, Lisa reminds them of why they traveled in the first place – the Model UN – and Milhouse is allowed a trial, with Bart as a judge.

As there is insufficient evidence to prove Milhouse ate all the food, Bart acquits him. Lisa proclaims the law has spoken, but it soon turns to outright mob rule as the other kids fail to accept the verdict and attempt to lynch Milhouse, as well as Bart and Lisa. They chase them into a cave, where all the kids are scared off by a monster for real. Martin then sees the "monster" is actually a wild boar. On one of the boar's tusks is an empty bag of chips, revealing that the boar was the culprit who ate all the snacks. Lisa says that if there is a live animal, there must be a food source somewhere, and recommends the slime it licks. The other kids instead kill the boar and eat it, while Lisa adheres to her strict vegetarianism by licking the rocks. A narration by James Earl Jones says the kids learned to live in peace and were somehow rescued by Moe Szyslak.

Back at home, Homer discovers that Ned Flanders has his own home-based Internet business and decides he wants to start his own company. However, Homer has not the foggiest idea of how an Internet business works nor what to peddle (he doesn't even own a computer). He is later visited by Bill Gates and his goons, who offer to buy him out. Homer then learns that Gates' definition of "buy out" is to smash up Homer's office, with the testy response "I did not get rich by writing a lot of checks".

Production
According to the DVD commentary for The Simpsons ninth season, the couch gag was suggested by Dan Castellaneta's niece. To make the fishermen's speech as accurate as possible, Cohen called a friend who spoke Mandarin. When the Chinese actors came, the actors did not feel Mandarin was geographically appropriate, and it was changed to Cantonese, which is spoken more in China's coastal regions and would be more appropriate for sailors and fishermen. In a deleted scene, Homer furnishes his home office with anti-stress toys, but becomes angry and stressful himself when he tries each of them due to their failure to work or their immediate breakage due to shoddy manufacturing. The producers said the decision to cut that scene was for timing purposes.

Cultural references 
Most of the episode's plot, namely a group of children trapped on an island and the breakdown of law, order and civility, is a reference to William Golding's 1954 novel Lord of the Flies, including the use of deus ex machina as a plot device that saves the children. A main diversion was while the episode showed the kids learning to live in peace, the novel had the boys' "war" broken up when they are rescued by a Navy ship, which, ironically, was in the middle of a war itself. The title comes from the 1981 film Das Boot, although it would be "" in German.

When the children are squabbling in the classroom, Principal Skinner restores order by banging his shoe on the desk. Skinner's actions are a reference to the shoe-banging incident by Soviet leader Nikita Khrushchev at the UN in 1960. The bus plunge off the overpass was inspired by the climax of the 1994 film True Lies, although some animators remarked a similar scene happened in the 1989 James Bond film Licence to Kill, where a corrupt cop helps to free the Bond villain from custody.

When the kids are on a manhunt of Lisa, Bart and Milhouse, they use charcoal ash on their faces like war paint, and Ralph Wiggum paints his in a cat style akin to Peter Criss of KISS. When escaping from the other children, Bart, Lisa and Milhouse have to swing across a gap on a vine; Milhouse goes across first, but refuses to throw the vine back (calling out that "there's no time") in a reference to the opening scene of the 1981 film Raiders of the Lost Ark, where Satipo does the same to Indiana Jones (but as an act of betrayal).

Reception
In its original broadcast, "Das Bus" finished 17th in ratings for the week of February 9–15, 1998, with a Nielsen rating of 9.9, equivalent to approximately 9.6 million viewing households. It was the third highest-rated show on the Fox network that week, following The X-Files and King of the Hill. In a 2006 article in USA Today, "Das Bus" was highlighted among the six best episodes of The Simpsons season 9, along with "Trash of the Titans", "The Last Temptation of Krust", "The Cartridge Family", "Dumbbell Indemnity", and "The Joy of Sect".

The authors of the book I Can't Believe It's a Bigger and Better Updated Unofficial Simpsons Guide, Warren Martyn and Adrian Wood, called it a "fantastic episode", adding: "Ignore the Internet business side, and wallow in the cleverness of the children trapped on the island. Bart has never been cleverer, Nelson more menacing, and Milhouse more geekish. Great stuff with a delightful ending that is so witty and obvious, that it's annoying you never imagined they'd get away with it."

The episode has become study material for sociology courses at University of California, Berkeley, where it is used to "examine issues of the production and reception of cultural objects, in this case, a satirical cartoon show", and to figure out what it is "trying to tell audiences about aspects primarily of American society, and, to a lesser extent, about other societies". Some questions asked in the courses include: "What aspects of American society are being addressed in the episode? What aspects of them are used to make the points? How is the satire conveyed: through language? Drawing? Music? Is the behavior of each character consistent with his/her character as developed over the years? Can we identify elements of the historical/political context that the writers are satirizing? What is the difference between satire and parody?"

Notes

References

External links

 

The Simpsons (season 9) episodes
1998 American television episodes
Castaways in fiction
Cultural depictions of Bill Gates
Television episodes written by David X. Cohen
Television episodes set on fictional islands
Television episodes about the Internet
Model United Nations